The Deutsche Kolonien und Auslandpostämpter Stempelkatalog (also known by its German acronym ARGE) is a philatelic reference which describes and publishes values for the postal markings found on the stamps of the German colonies and German post offices abroad.

Philately of Germany